Mitchell White (born March 30, 1990) is a Canadian football cornerback for the Montreal Alouettes of the Canadian Football League (CFL). He played college football at Michigan State.

Professional career

Oakland Raiders
On May 13, 2013, White signed with the Oakland Raiders as an undrafted free agent. He was waived on August 27, 2013.

Montreal Alouettes
White signed with the Montreal Alouettes of the Canadian Football League on October 17, 2013 and spent the remainder of the year on the practice roster. He then played in 12 games in 2014 and 16 games in 2015 recording 59 defensive tackles and one interception as an Alouette. He was released during the team's training camp on June 19, 2016.

Ottawa Redblacks
Shortly after his release, he signed with the Ottawa Redblacks on July 17, 2016, where he was named a CFL East All-Star for the 2016 season, and started in the team's Grey Cup championship victory. He was released after the season to pursue NFL opportunities.

Philadelphia Eagles
On January 9, 2017, White signed with the Philadelphia Eagles. He was waived on August 13, 2017, only to be re-signed two days later. He was waived on August 30, 2017.

Toronto Argonauts
On September 10, 2017, White was signed by the Toronto Argonauts. Despite only playing in six games during the regular season, White recorded three interceptions, and won his second Grey Cup alongside fellow 2016 champion Cleyon Laing.

Montreal Alouettes (second stint)
As a top free agent, White rejoined Montreal in 2018, signing a two year contract worth $140,000 Canadian in 2018, with a potential increase for 2019. White produced 13 tackles in 6 games played, but suffered a possible career ending injury against Edmonton early in the season.

References

External links
Toronto Argonauts bio
Michigan State Spartans bio

1990 births
Living people
American football cornerbacks
Canadian football defensive backs
American players of Canadian football
Michigan State Spartans football players
Montreal Alouettes players
Oakland Raiders players
Ottawa Redblacks players
Philadelphia Eagles players
Toronto Argonauts players
Players of American football from Michigan
Sportspeople from Livonia, Michigan